Ruže cvetaju samo u pesmama is the fourth studio album by Serbian singer Dragana Mirković and the second to feature the band Južni Vetar. It was released in 1987.

This is Dragana's second album with Južni Vetar. They went on to record a total of five albums together, one was released each year beginning in 1986.

Track listing

References

1987 albums
Dragana Mirković albums